Evdokia Ilyinichna Uralova (1902-1985) was a Soviet-Belarusian Politician (Communist).

She served as Minister of Education in 1946–1947.

References

20th-century Belarusian women politicians
20th-century Belarusian politicians
Soviet women in politics
Belarusian communists
Women government ministers of Belarus

1902 births

1985 deaths